Kamel Mubdir al-Kilani (born 1958) was Minister of Finance in the cabinet appointed by the Interim Iraq Governing Council in September 2003. A Sunni Muslim and contractor, al-Kilani remained in Iraq during the span of the Saddam Hussein government. He holds a diploma degree in economics and public administration from Mustansiriyah University in Baghdad

References
 

Government ministers of Iraq
1958 births
Living people
Iraqi people of Iranian descent
Finance ministers of Iraq